Wen Li is a space physicist at Boston University. Her research interests include space plasma waves, Earth's radiation belt physics, solar-wind magnetosphere coupling, energetic particle precipitation, and Jovian magnetosphere and aurora: She is a Fellow of the American Geophysical Union.

Biography
In 2005, Wen Li received her B.Sc. in Geophysics from the University of Science and Technology of China. In 2007 and 2010, she got her M.S. and Ph.D. in Atmospheric and Oceanic Sciences from the University of California, Los Angeles. Following her Ph.D. she remained at the University of California, Los Angeles as an associate researcher until she moved to Boston University in 2016.

Li's research centers on waves in Earth's magnetosphere, modeling Earth's radiation belts, and examining radiation belts on Jupiter. In 2019, she received funding to examine plasma waves called 'whistler mode waves', which are high energy electrons in Earth's radiation belts.

Research
One of Li's research areas is "killer electrons," electrons that emit such a high level of radiation that they can damage the satellites in Earth's radiation belts. Li uses multi-satellite observations to study this process, benefiting national security and commercial interests.

Her research and use of low-altitude satellite data has revealed that electromagnetic ion cyclotron waves during geomagnetic storms and recovery cause the loss of relativistic electrons that would typically be trapped in Earth's radiation belts. To understand the distribution of these plasma waves, Li used the low-satellite data to calculate the properties of plasma waves and create a much more detailed global distribution than available before. These developments have been incorporated into numerous other research projects and studies since then.

Honors and awards 
2015: Air Force Young Investigator Award
2014, 2015, 2016: Young Scientists Awards in the International Union of Radio Science
2017: American Geophysical Union (AGU) Fellow
2017: AGU James B. Macelwane Medal
2018: Alfred P. Sloan Research Fellow in Physics
2019: NSF CAREER Award

Selected publications

References

External links

Wen Li Website

University of Science and Technology of China alumni
University of California, Los Angeles alumni
Chinese physicists
Fellows of the American Geophysical Union
Living people
Boston University faculty
Women planetary scientists
Planetary scientists
American women physicists
Year of birth missing (living people)
21st-century American women scientists